Ram Chandra Vikal Gurjar (8 November 1916 in Nayagaon Basantpur, Gautam Buddha Nagar district – 26 June 2011) was a freedom fighter. He was an agriculture minister and was elected twice as a Member of Parliament as well as a five-time Member of the Legislative Assembly. He had charge of Jammu and Kashmir during the governments of Indira Gandhi and Rajiv Gandhi. He was also a well known yoga teacher.
Vikal was influenced by the ideology of the Arya Samaj from childhood and participated in the freedom movement from his student days. An agriculturist, Vikal championed the cause of the farmers, labourers and backward classes, and was instrumental in implementing various social welfare measures such as getting irrigation rates reduced and land revenue written off.

He also contributed to the setting up of various infrastructure facilities in the towns and villages of Uttar Pradesh by having bridges and railway lines constructed. He was also instrumental in getting several primary schools and colleges set up, establishing agricultural universities in Faizabad and Kanpur and a medical college in Meerut. Vikal was awarded the Degree of Vidyavachaspati, Honoris Causa, by the Gurukul Mahavidyalaya, Jwalapur (Haridwar).

Ram Chandra Vikal Gurjar started his legislative career as a Member of the Uttar Pradesh Legislative Assembly in 1952 and was Member of that Assembly from 1952 to 1971. He held various ministerial posts — Forests and Animal Husbandry, Excise, Agriculture, Irrigation, Jail and Fisheries – in the government of Uttar Pradesh from 1967 to 1970. He was also Leader of the Opposition in the Uttar Pradesh Legislative Assembly in 1967 and Chairman of State Farms Corporation of India from 1982 to 1984.

Vikal was a Member of the Fifth Lok Sabha from Bagpat and represented Uttar Pradesh in the Rajya Sabha from April 1984 to April 1990.

Shri Ram Chandra Vikal Gurjar had actively participated in the freedom struggle from his student life and fought against British rule during pre-Independence period. He gave up studies on the call of Mahatama Gandhi, boycotted foreign-made clothes and actively worked for the Congress Party. Shri Vikal gave up the teaching profession after assassination of Mahatama Gandhi. He worked for World Peace and in this respect, attended World Peace Conference held in Japan, 1970. He had maintained healthy and sound relations with Fuji Guruji of Japan. He also participated in various activities relating to social change during post-Independence period as well. Shri Vikal was weighed by farmers with silver (2 maunds and 17 seers) on 26 January 1963 which was donated to Pt. Jawaharlal Nehru for National Defence. He was instrumental in opening 100 primary schools, several Intermediate and Degree colleges in his constituency, Agricultural Universities in Faizabad and Kanpur and Medical college at Meerut. He played main role in setting up a Fertilizer Factory at Phulpur, Allahabad. It was due to his efforts that Shahadara-Sharanpur meter-gauge line was converted into broad-gauge line. 
Shri Vikal was Member of Legislative Assembly, Uttar Pradesh from 1952 to 1971 and the Member of Parliament of Fifth Lok Sabha. He was elected to the Rajya Sabha from April, 1984 to 1990. During the leaderships of Smt. Indira Gandhi, Shri Rajiv Gandhi and Shri P.V. Narsingh Rao, he was the member of Working Committee of AICC from 1977 to 1991.

Shri Vikal was the Founder and President of Kisan Mazdoor Party, 1967 and President of All India Backward Classes Cell of Congress since 1967. He was Vice-President of Congress Committee of Uttar Pradesh in 1972. He was the Chairman of Assurance Committee, U.P. Legislative Assembly in 1970–71. He was also the Chairman of State Farm Corporation of India from March, 1982 to 1984.

Shri Vikal was the Member of Zila Parishad, Bullandshahar in 1948. He was also the Member of AICC from 1958 to 1971. He had been the Member of Estimates Committee of U.P. Assembly for two years. He was the Member of Standing Committee of Irrigation and Power and Finance. He was at the Panel of Chairmen, U.P. Legislative Assembly from 1969 to 1970. He was Member of Business Advisory Committee, Rajya Sabha from 1984 to 1985. He was elected Leader of S.V.D. and Leader of Opposition, U.P. Legislative Assembly, 1967. He held the office of Minister of Forests and Animal Husbandry, Excise, Jail and Fisheries, Agriculture, Irrigation. He was the Chairman of all India Kisan Congress.

Deputy Chief Minister of Uttar Pradesh 
In 1967, after differences in the Congress, he joined Chaudhary Charan Singh and Charan Singh made him the Deputy Chief Minister, he was the Deputy Chief Minister of Uttar Pradesh from 1967 to 1969.

References

External links
 https://vikalsocialwelfare.com/
 https://www.facebook.com/ramchandravikalu.p

2011 deaths
1916 births
India MPs 1971–1977
People from Ghaziabad district, India
Lok Sabha members from Uttar Pradesh
Rajya Sabha members from Uttar Pradesh
Leaders of the Opposition in the Uttar Pradesh Legislative Assembly
Deputy chief ministers of Uttar Pradesh
People from Baghpat
Indian National Congress politicians from Uttar Pradesh
Uttar Pradesh MLAs 1967–1969
Uttar Pradesh MLAs 1952–1957
Kisan Mazdoor Praja Party politicians